Jiāngchéng (江城) may refer to the following locations in China:

Jiangcheng Hani and Yi Autonomous County, Pu'er Prefecture, Yunnan
Jiangcheng District, Yangjiang, Guangdong
Jiangcheng, Tiandong County, Guangxi
Jiangcheng, Jiangchuan County, in Jiangchuan County, Yunnan
Jiangcheng Township, Xinshi District, Baoding, Hebei